The Treaty of Paris signed in March 1657 allied the English Protectorate of Oliver Cromwell with King Louis XIV of France against King Philip IV of Spain, merging the Anglo-Spanish War (1654–1660) with the larger Franco-Spanish War (1635–1659). The treaty confirmed the growing rapprochement between France and the English Republican regime.

Until the mid-1650s, the French had been supporters of the Royalist exiles under Charles II, but the move towards an alliance with Cromwell led Charles to conclude the Treaty of Brussels with Spain in 1656.

Terms
The English agreed to join France in its war against Spain in Flanders. France would contribute an army of 20,000 men. England would contribute both 6,000 troops and its fleet in a campaign against the Flemish coastal fortresses of Gravelines, Dunkirk and Mardyck.

Gravelines would be ceded to France and Dunkirk and Mardyck to England. Dunkirk, in particular, was on the Commonwealth's mind mainly because of the privateers that were causing damage to the mercantile fleet. For Cromwell and the Commonwealth, the question of possession of Dunkirk thus passed from a diplomatic possibility in the region to urgent political necessity.

References

Sources

1657 in law
1657 treaties
History of Paris
Treaties of the Interregnum (England)
Treaties of the Kingdom of France
1657 in France
1657 in England
17th century in Paris
England–France relations
17th-century military history of France